The 1798–99 United States Senate elections were held on various dates in various states. As these U.S. Senate elections were prior to the ratification of the Seventeenth Amendment in 1913, senators were chosen by state legislatures. Senators were elected over a wide range of time throughout 1798 and 1799, and a seat may have been filled months late or remained vacant due to legislative deadlock. In these elections, terms were up for the senators in Class 2.

They occurred in the middle of President John Adams's administration, and had no net change in political control of the Senate.

Results summary 
Senate party division, 6th Congress (1799–1801)

 Majority party: Federalist (22)
 Minority party: Democratic-Republican (9)
 Other parties: 0
 Total seats: 31

Change in composition

Before the elections 
After the January 19, 1798, election in Delaware.

Results of the elections

Beginning of the next Congress

Race summaries 
Except if/when noted, the number following candidates is the whole number vote(s), not a percentage.

Special elections during the 5th Congress 
In these special elections, the winner was seated before March 4, 1799; ordered by election date.

Races leading to the 6th Congress 
In these regular elections, the winner was seated on March 4, 1799; ordered by state.

All of the elections involved the Class 2 seats.

Special elections during the 6th Congress 
In this special election, the winner was seated after March 4, 1799, the beginning of the next Congress.

See also
 1798 United States elections
 1798–99 United States House of Representatives elections
 5th United States Congress
 6th United States Congress

Notes

References
 Party Division in the Senate, 1789-Present, via Senate.gov